Shooto Watanabe is a Japanese male mixed martial artist who competes in the Bantamweight division. He has previously fought for RIZIN Fighting Federation.

Background
As the name "Shooto" implies, he is the son of Yuichi Watanabe, the first welterweight champion of Shooto , as his father . He studied judo from the 5th grade of elementary school , belonged to the wrestling club in parallel from junior high school , and entered high school at Ashikaga Institute of Technology, a prestigious school for wrestling. He entered college and stayed away from wrestling for a while, but was impressed by Masato's retirement match and decided to follow the same martial arts path as his father.

Career

Debut
He made his debut at Pancrase Progress Tour 4, earning a draw against Yoshifumi Ishiki.

ZST
3 months following his pro debut, he entered ZST's Bantamweight tournament, earning his first victory against Tadayuki Nakamura with what would become his patented rear-naked choke at ZST: Battle Hazard 6. He followed this up by scoring a unanimous decision victory in the semifinals against Nobuyuki Kanaizuka at ZST: SWAT! 47  He met future ZST Flyweight Champion, Seiichiro Ito in the finals, scoring an emphatic submission in just 62 seconds to capture the bantamweight tournament championship at ZST: SWAT! in Face 11  Despite winning a tournament only 5 months into his career, he would face a dip in form, going 2-1-3 in his next 6 fights, with his sole victory coming against Shintaro Kubo at VTJ 2nd in June 2013. He started 2014 off with a stoppage loss to future foe Go Kashiwazaki, but strung together a 7-fight unbeaten streak lasting 2 and a half years, earning a rematch with Kashiwazaki - this time for the ZST Bantamweight Championship. His fate would be nearly identical, losing via stoppage in the 2nd round. This would prove to be his final appearance with ZST, finishing with a 8-3-4 record in the promotion (9-3-5, 1NC overall).

Fighting NEXUS & GLADIATOR
Watanabe would make his Fighting NEXUS debut 3 months following his failed title challenge for the ZST title, kicking off his NEXUS career nearly identical to his ZST debut, a rear-naked choke victory in just 85 seconds. 4 months later he competed under the GLADIATOR banner, scoring a second successive rear-naked choke victory against Yutaka Imamura; a victory which would catapult him to his second title challenge in 12 months. However, he first competed at Fighting NEXUS 9, finishing Jun Ikkyu with a guillotine choke in just 24 seconds. This allowed for a quick turnaround, to face Naritoshi Kakuta for the GLADIATOR Bantamweight Championship. However, once again, Watanabe would come up short, dropping a unanimous decision. He closed out 2017 with a unanimous decision victory of his own, over Kotaro Kazama. This win would spur on a 9-fight unbeaten streak, in which he would capture the vacant Fighting NEXUS Bantamweight Championship in December 2018, and score 2 victories under the DEEP promotion.

RIZIN Fighting Federation
With an impressive unbeaten streak stretching back 2 and a half years, Japan's premier MMA promotion, Rizin Fighting Federation announced that Watanabe would be facing rising prospect and UFC veteran, Naoki Inoue on August 9, 2020 at Rizin 22. Watanabe was defeated at 1:40 of the first round via rear-naked choke.

On February 16, it was announced that Watanabe would face Takumi Tamaru at Rizin 27 to earn a spot in RIZIN's upcoming Japan Bantamweight Grand Prix, with the winner of the grand prix being expected to face RIZIN Bantamweight Champion, Kyoji Horiguchi in 2022. Watanabe defeated Tamaru by rear-naked choke in the 2nd round.

4 days later, RIZIN held a press conference where the drawing for the Grand Prix would occur. Former RIZIN Bantamweight Champion Kai Asakura chose the slot to face Watanabe. They faced each other at Rizin 28 on June 13, 2021 at the Tokyo Dome. Shooto lost the fight by a first-round technical knockout.

Watanabe was scheduled to face Kuya Ito on October 10, 2021 at Rizin Landmark Vol.1. Ito later withdrew from his bout with Watanabe due to COVID-19 protocols, and was replaced by Nobutaka Naito. He won the bout after choking Naito unconscious via brabo choke in the first round.

Watanabe was booked to face Takuma Sudo on April 16, 2022 at Rizin Trigger 3. He lost the fight by split decision.

DEEP 
Watanabe faced Takuma Uchiyama at Deep 108 Impact on July 10, 2022. He won the bout by unanimous decision.

Watanabe faced Rikiya Matsuzawa on February 11, 2023 at DEEP 112, losing the bout via TKO stoppage 27 seconds into the bout.

Personal life
Watanabe is the son of MMA pioneer and Shooto's inaugural Lightweight Champion, Yuichi Watanabe. His mother also competed in Shooto.

Championships and accomplishments
 Fighting NEXUS
Fighting Nexus Bantamweight Championship (One time)
One successful title defense

Mixed martial arts record

|-
|Loss
|align=center|24–8–6 (1)
|Rikiya Matsuzawa
|TKO (punches)
|Deep 112 Impact
|
|align=center|1 
|align=center|0:27
|Tokyo, Japan
|
|-
|Win
|align=center|24–7–6 (1)
|Takuma Uchiyama
|Decision (unanimous)
|Deep 108 Impact
|
|align=center|3
|align=center|5:00
|Tokyo, Japan
|
|-
|Loss
|align=center|23–7–6 (1)
|Takuma Sudo
|Decision (split)
|Rizin Trigger 3
|
|align=center|3
|align=center|5:00
|Chōfu, Japan
|
|-
| Win
| align=center|23–6–6 (1)
|Nobutaka Naito
|Technical Submission (D’Arce choke)
|Rizin Landmark Vol.1
|
|align=center|1
|align=center|1:33
|Tokyo, Japan
|
|-
| Loss
| align=center|22–6–6 (1)
|Kai Asakura
|TKO (punches)
|Rizin 28
|
|align=center|1
|align=center|3:22
|Tokyo, Japan
|
|-
| Win
| align=center|22–5–6 (1)
| Takumi Tamaru
|Submission (rear-naked choke)
|Rizin 27 
|
|align=center|2
|align=center|4:13
|Nagoya, Japan
|
|-
| Win
| align=center|21–5–6 (1)
| Takashi Terada
| Submission (rear-naked choke)
|Fighting NEXUS vol.21×PFC.24
|
| align=center| 1
| align=center| 1:37
|Shinjuku, Japan
|
|-
| Loss
| align=center|20–5–6 (1)
| Naoki Inoue
|Submission (rear-naked choke)
|Rizin 22
|
|align=center|1
|align=center|1:40
|Yokohama, Japan
|
|-
| Win
| align=center|
| Hiroto Sakuma
|Submission (rear-naked choke)
|Fighting NEXUS vol. 18
|
|align=center|1
|align=center|3:48
|Tokyo, Japan
|
|-
| Win
| align=center|19–4–6 (1)
| Yoichiro Kuranobu
| Decision (unanimous)
|DEEP 91 Impact
|
| align=center| 2
| align=center| 5:00
|Tokyo, Japan
|
|-
| Win
| align=center|18–4–6 (1)
| Hiroyuki Kobayashi
|Technical Submission (rear-naked choke)
| DEEP 90 Impact
| 
| align=center| 1
| align=center| 1:22
| Tokyo, Japan
|
|-
| Win
| align=center|17–4–6 (1)
| Kodai Murata
| Decision (unanimous)
|rowspan=2 | Fighting NEXUS vol.15
|rowspan=2 |
|align=center|2
|align=center|5:00
|rowspan=2 |Shinjuku, Japan
| 
|-
| Win
| align=center|16–4–6 (1)
| Takeya Takemoto
| DQ (illegal upkick)
| align=center| 1
| align=center| 1:54
|
|-
| Win
| align=center|15–4–6 (1)
| Great MajingaZ
| Submission (rear-naked choke)
|Fighting NEXUS vol.14
|
|align=center|1
|align=center|1:23
|Tokyo, Japan
|
|-
| Win
| align=center|14–4–6 (1)
| Teppei Suwabe
| Decision (unanimous)
|Fighting NEXUS vol. 13
|
| align=center| 2
| align=center| 5:00
|Tokyo, Japan
|
|-
| Draw
| align=center|13–4–6 (1)
| Takeya Takemoto
|Draw (split)
|GLADIATOR 005 in Osaka
| 
|align=center|2
|align=center|5:00
|Osaka, Japan
|
|-
| Win
| align=center|13–4–5 (1)
| Kotaro Kazama
| Decision (unanimous)
| Fighting NEXUS vol. 11
| 
|align=Center|2
|align=center|5:00
|Shinjuku, Japan
| 
|-
| Loss
| align=center|12–4–5 (1)
| Naritoshi Kakuta
| Decision (unanimous)
| GLADIATOR 004
| 
| align=center| 3
| align=center| 5:00
| Wakayama, Japan
| 
|-
| Win
| align=center|12–3–5 (1)
| Hitoya Sumisojun
|Submission (guillotine choke)
|Fighting NEXUS 9
|
|align=center|1
|align=center|0:24
|Tokyo, Japan
| 
|-
| Win
| align=center|11–3–5 (1)
| Yutaka Imamura
| Submission (rear-naked choke)
| GLADIATOR 3 in Wakayama
|
| align=center| 1
| align=center| 2:09
|Wakayama, Japan
| 
|-
| Win
| align=center| (1)
| Yoshiyuki Sakurazawa
| Submission (rear-naked choke)
|Fighting NEXUS 8
|
| align=center| 1
| align=center| 1:25
|Tokyo, Japan
|
|-
| Loss
| align=center|9–3–5 (1)
| Go Kashiwazaki
|TKO (punches)
|ZST 53
|
|align=center|2
|align=center|4:59
|Tokyo, Japan
|
|-
| Win
| align=center|9–2–5 (1)
| Yasuhiro Wakabayashi
| TKO (punches)
| ZST 50
| 
| align=center| 1
| align=center| 3:42
| Tokyo, Japan
|
|-
|NC
|align=center|8–2–5 (1)
|Zheng Junfeng
|No Contest (overturned)
|WLF E.P.I.C. 2
|
|align=center|2
|align=center|3:00
|Zhengzhou, China
|
|-
| Win
| align=center|8–2–5
| Kohei Kuraoka
| Submission (rear-naked choke)
|ZST 49: 13th Anniversary
| 
|align=Center|1
|align=center|1:43
|Tokyo, Japan
| 
|-
| Draw
| align=center|7–2–5
| Atsushi Kato
| Draw (split)
| ZST 46
| 
| align=center| 3
| align=center| 5:00
| Tokyo, Japan
| 
|-
| Win
| align=center|7–2–4
| Shintaro Kubo
|Submission (rear-naked choke)
|ZST 44
|
|align=center|1
|align=center|3:00
|Tokyo, Japan
| 
|-
| Win
| align=center|6–2–4
| Seio Date
|TKO (punches)
| ZST 42
|
|align=center| 1
|align=center| 2:47
|Tokyo, Japan
|
|-
| Win
| align=center|5–2–4
| Ryutaro Watanabe
| Submission (rear-naked choke)
|ZST in Yokosuka Vol. 1
|
| align=center| 1
| align=center| 1:19
| Yokohama, Japan
|
|-
| Loss
| align=center|4–2–4
| Go Kashiwazaki
|TKO (knee)
| ZST 39
| 
| align=center|2
| align=center|3:57
| Tokyo, Japan
|
|-
| Draw
| align=center|4–1–4
|Kengo Okubo
|Draw (time limit)
| ZST 37
| 
| align=center|2
| align=center|5:00
|Tokyo, Japan
|
|-
| Win
| align=center|4–1–3
| Shintaro Kubo
|Decision (unanimous)
|Vale Tudo Japan 2
|
|align=center|3
|align=center|3:00
|Tokyo, Japan
|
|-
| Draw
| align=center|3–1–3
| Takao Ueda
| Draw (time limit)
| ZST 35
| 
| align=center| 2
| align=center| 5:00
| Tokyo, Japan
|
|-
| Loss
| align=center|3–1–2
| Toshihiro Shimizu
| Submission (triangle choke)
|ZST 34
|
|align=center|1
|align=center|3:29
|Tokyo, Japan
| 
|-
| Draw
| align=center|3–0–2
| Tetsuya Fusano
| Draw (time limit)
| ZST 33: 10th Anniversary
| 
| align=center| 2
| align=center| 5:00
| Tokyo, Japan
| 
|-
| Win
| align=center|3–0–1
| Seiichiro Ito
| Submission (rear-naked choke)
| ZST: SWAT! in Face 11
| 
| align=center| 1
| align=center| 1:02
| Tokyo, Japan
| 
|-
| Win
| align=center|2–0–1
| Nobuyuki Kanaizuka
| Decision (unanimous)
| ZST: SWAT! 47
| 
| align=center| 2
| align=center| 5:00
| Chōfu, Japan
| 
|-
| Win
| align=center|1–0–1
| Tadayuki Nakamura
| Submission (rear-naked choke)
|ZST: Battle Hazard 6
|
| align=center| 1
| align=center| 1:54
|Tokyo, Japan
| 
|-
| Draw
| align=center|0–0–1
| Yoshifumi Ishiki
| Draw (time limit)
| Pancrase Progress Tour 4
| 
| align=center| 2
| align=center| 5:00
| Tokyo, Japan
|

See also
 List of current Rizin FF fighters
 List of male mixed martial artists

References

External links
 

Japanese male mixed martial artists
Bantamweight mixed martial artists
Mixed martial artists utilizing judo
Mixed martial artists utilizing wrestling
Japanese male judoka
Living people
1989 births